Bar La Curva / Plamy Na Słońcu (Bar La Curva / Spots on the Sun) is the fourth studio album by Polish rock/rapcore band Kazik Na Żywo. It is the band's first studio album since 1999's Las Maquinas de la Muerte.

Track listing

14 - lyrics by Krzysztof Dowgiałło, music by Mieczysław Cholewa.

Personnel
Kazik Staszewski - vocal, lyrics
Adam Burzyński - guitar, mixing
Robert Friedrich - guitar, mixing
Tomasz Goehs - drums
Michał Kwiatkowski - bass, lyrics

References

2011 albums
Kazik na Żywo albums